was a railway station in Shizukuishi, Iwate. It was the terminal station of JGR Hashiba Line. Officially it is not closed but just stopped its operation.

Layout
Hashiba Station had two side platforms serving two tracks.

History
In 1922, this station was opened as a temporary terminal station in the middle stage of the Tazawako Line construction and the line was called Hashiba Line. In 1944 (in the World War II) its operation was stopped as Fuyōfukyū Line. After World War II the construction of Tazawako Line was restarted and completed in 1966. But new route plan did not pass this station, so this station was remained operation stopped.

External links
「山さ行がねが」国鉄橋場線および橋場駅(Let's go to the mountain) 

Defunct railway stations in Japan